The following is a partial discography of the opera The Magic Flute (Die Zauberflöte) by Wolfgang Amadeus Mozart. It was composed and first performed in 1791, the year of the composer's death. Since the first complete recordings in 1937, the opera has been recorded many times.

In the list below, "Year" indicates the date the recording was made, rather than when it was issued . Most of these recordings have had multiple reissues, and in some cases are currently available on more than one label. The label information provided is usually the most recent issue of the recording, and where possible the release date has been provided.

Recordings

Audio

Video

References
Notes

Sources

Opera discographies
discography